Sudhir Joshi (1948  – 14 December 2005) was an Indian Marathi actor and comedian.

Born in Dadar, Joshi attended Pinto Villa (branch of Raja Shivaji Vidyalaya) and later Kirti College to obtain his BA Economics. He also studied law at Kirti. He worked as a sales executive at the publishing company Blackie and Sons. Leaving this position in 1973, he worked in other sales related jobs for a year, then happened upon a chance to act in a play in 1974.  It was to be the start of Joshi's acting career

Due to massive heart attack he died in Mumbai in December, 2005.

Filmography

Films 

 Anantyatra (1985)
 Hamal De Dhamal (1989) - Colonel Arjun Patwardhan (Nandini's father)
 Kala Bazar (1989)
 Balache Baap Brahmachari (1989) - Babasaheb Kirtikar (Priya's father)
 Ek Full Char Half
 Gholat Ghol
 Jamla Ho Jamla
 Gammat Jammat (1987) - Mama (Shrikant's uncle) 
 Ashi Hi Banwa Banwi (1988) - Vishwas Sarpotdar (landlord)
 Rangat Sangat (1988)
 Kiss Bai Kiss (1988) 
 Atmavishwas (1989) - Dr. Balasaheb Sarpotdar (Vasanti's husband)
 Bhutacha Bhau (1989)
 Eena Meena Deeka (1989)
 Ghanchakkar (1990)
 Tujhi Majhi Jamalli Jodi (1990) 
 Lapwa Chhapwi (1990) 
 Aamchya Sarkhe Aamhich (1990) - Chandrakant Inamdar (Nirbhay and Abhay's uncle)
 Aflatoon (1991)
 Aayatya Gharat Gharoba (1991) - Vishwas Sarpotdar (Ajay's father)
 Aaplee Maanse (1993)
 Paisa Paisa Paisa (1993)
 Savat Mazi Ladki (1993) - Dadasaheb Hirve (Madhu's brother)
 Sasarche Dhotar (1994) 
 Vazir (1994)
 Limited Manuski (1995)
 Hasari (1997)
 Premankur (1998)
 China Gate (1998)
 Khiladi 420 (2000)
 Pukar (2000)
 Navra Majhya Muthit Ga! (2000)
 Devki
 Tu Tithe Mee
 Ek Unaad Diwas (2004)
 Matichya Chuli (2005)
 Maine Gandhi ko Nahi Mara (2005)

Plays 

 Ghar Shrimantacha
 Sakhi Shejarini
 Paryaay
 Ekda Pahava Karun
 Hasta Hasta
 Lapandav
 Ashvamedh
 Tur Tur
 Shante Cha Karta Chalu Aahe
 Jodidar
 I Am Not Bajirao

Television 

 Indradhanushya
 Prapanch
 Puneri Punekar
 Bhikaji Karodpati
 Gajra
 Comedy Dot Com (Zee marathi)
 Gilli Danda
 Hum Paanch (Hindi)
 Chutki Baja Ke (Hindi)
 Don't Worry Ho Jayega (Hindi)
 405 Anandvan
 एक हा असा धागा सुखाचा

References

External links

Marathi actors
1948 births
2005 deaths
Male actors in Marathi cinema
20th-century Indian male actors
Indian male television actors
Indian male stage actors
Male actors from Mumbai